Frank Reginald Farmer OBE, FRS, (18 December 1914 – 10 June 2001) was a British nuclear regulator (working for the United Kingdom Atomic Energy Authority's Safety and Reliability Directorate, SRD) and later an academic at Imperial College London.

Accomplishments
He considered the public acceptability of risk, (e.g. from nuclear reactors), arguing that a whole spectrum of events needs to be considered - not just the Maximum Credible Accident, but also those of less consequence but which were much more probable.
He used examples such as hill walking to define a spectrum of risks which people found acceptable.
He embodied this in a variation of (Acceptable Risk Frequency/Event Probability) with (Consequence), which is usually called the Farmer Curve.
Farmer postulated a near-inverse variation as acceptable - thus events which have twice the consequence must be approximately half as frequent, or less. The Farmer Curve is usually plotted as a straight line in log-log co-ordinates.

He was made an OBE in 1967 and  elected a Fellow of the Royal Society in 1981.

References

 typical Farmer Paper

1914 births
2001 deaths
Academics of Imperial College London
Members of the Order of the British Empire
Fellows of the Royal Society